Rosenblattichthys is a genus of pearleyes.

Species
There are currently four recognized species in this genus:
 Rosenblattichthys alatus (Fourmanoir, 1970) (Winged pearleye)
 Rosenblattichthys hubbsi R. K. Johnson, 1974 (Hubb's pearleye)
 Rosenblattichthys nemotoi Okiyama & R. K. Johnson, 1986
 Rosenblattichthys volucris (Rofen, 1966) (Chubby pearleye)

References

Aulopiformes
Taxa named by Robert Karl Johnson